Brent Anderson may refer to:

 Brent Anderson (comics) (born 1955), American comics artist
 Brent Anderson (singer) (born 1988), American country music singer
 Brent Anderson (rugby union) (born 1960), New Zealand rugby union player
 Brent Anderson (Mississippi politician) (born 1972), American politician
 Brent F. Anderson (1932–2013), American politician